Ticker is a 2001 American action film directed by Albert Pyun and starring Tom Sizemore, Jaime Pressly, Dennis Hopper, Steven Seagal, Ice-T, Kevin Gage, and Nas.

Plot
A SWAT team converges on the house of a United States Senator, who is being held hostage. The bomb squad arrives; Frank Glass (Steven Seagal) finds a bomb in the basement and works to disarm it while the SWAT team is in a shootout with the hostage takers. Glass disarms the bomb but deems it too easy, believing it was designed to mislead him. The real bomb detonates, killing everyone inside.

A year later in San Francisco, narcotics cops Ray Nettles (Tom Sizemore) and partner Art "Fuzzy" Rice (Nas) arrest a suspect on drug charges. Ray lets a woman go who pleads for her and her child; Fuzzy tells Ray to get some help for his "demons" - he has never mourned the car bombing death of his wife and son. They see people entering a warehouse late at night and investigate. Ray apprehends a woman and three men converge on him; Fuzzy is shot by their leader (Dennis Hopper) and the three men flee. Ray arrests the woman, Claire (Jaime Pressly), but she refuses to say anything about the men. She is wearing an odd-looking bracelet which Nettles takes to the bomb squad for Glass to look over. The bracelet is found to contain detonation cord and Semtex explosive. The leader tells the police they have one hour to release Claire; when they do not, he bombs a bar.

Ray takes Glass back to the warehouse where they find a French cigarette and matchbook from a jazz club.  They go to the club and kill one of the bombers, disarming his bomb.  Ray questions Claire again; she reveals the bomber's names - Alex Swan, the leader, and Vershbow, the surviving member.  She claims that no matter what happens, she will be killed for getting caught, and has decided to cooperate.    Swan intends to plant a bomb at the police station, but Vershbow gets cold feet and forces Swan to give him the bomb at gunpoint.  The police corner him and Glass apparently prevents the detonation, but Swan detonates several more bombs using a pay phone.

Swan arranges a massive bombing with a crew led by Vincent Cruichshank (Ice-T). Ray convinces the police to release Claire, hoping to avert another bombing, and they give her a tracking device.  Once she meets up with Swan, however, she disables the tracker and works with him.  They discuss their upcoming "masterpiece," and Claire goes to a phone booth to activate the bomb.  She detonates a car bomb in Swan's car, instead.  Confused, Glass tells Ray they must both be dead.  Seeing City Hall on TV, Ray remembers Claire's story about her husband and realizes she was the mastermind all along.  They rush to City Hall and split up - Ray goes to the basement and Glass to the roof.  Ray is forced to disarm a bomb with advice over the radio from Glass, who coaches him to relax and forget his grief, but the device is a decoy.  Glass disarms the real bomb on the roof.

Cast
 Tom Sizemore as Detective Ray Nettles
 Steven Seagal as Lieutenant Frank Glass, Demolitions Expert and Bomb Squad Chief
 Dennis Hopper as Alex Swan, Irish Terrorist
 Nas as Detective Art "Fuzzy" Rice
 Jaime Pressly as Claire Manning
 Kevin Gage as Payton "Pooch" Stad, Bomb Squad Expert
 Romany Malco as T.J. Littles, Bomb Squad Expert
 Mimi Rose as Beverly "Bev" Seabo, Bomb Squad Secretary
 Peter Greene as Detective Artie Pluchinsky
 Ice-T as Vincent Cruichshank, Terrorist Commander
 Rozonda "Chilli" Thomas as Lilly McCutcheon 
 Michael Halsey as Simon Vershbow, Swan's Assistant 
 Norbert Weisser as Billy Dugger, Swan's Assistant
 Joe Spano as Captain R.J. Winters
 Milos Milicevic as Milos, Balkan Terrorist At Governor's Mansion
 Jenny McShane as Nettles' Wife
 Joey Meyer Rosenblum as Pooch's Son

References

External links

2001 films
2001 action thriller films
American action thriller films
Artisan Entertainment films
Nu Image films
Films directed by Albert Pyun
Films shot in Bulgaria
MoviePass Films films
2000s chase films
2000s English-language films
2000s American films